Lana is a town and municipality located in the province and autonomous community of Navarre, northern Spain with a population of 197 people.

References

External links
 LANA in the Bernardo Estornés Lasa - Auñamendi Encyclopedia (Euskomedia Fundazioa) 

Municipalities in Navarre